The National Women's Soccer League (NWSL) federation players were players whose salaries for playing in the NWSL were paid for by their respective national federations from 2013 to 2021. American federation players were contracted to the United States Soccer Federation (USSF) and not to their respective NWSL clubs, whereas Canadian federation players were contracted directly to their respective NWSL clubs. Federation players were sometimes known as allocated players, allocation players, or subsidized players, which occasionally created confusion with players paid using the NWSL's "allocation money," a mechanism introduced before the 2020 NWSL season.

NWSL federation players originally came from the USSF, the Canadian Soccer Association (CSA), and the Mexican Football Federation (FMF), and they were distributed to the eight founding teams of the NWSL through a player allocation process in January 2013. The FMF ceased allocating players to the NWSL in 2016 and before starting its own national league, Liga MX Femenil, in 2017.

At the end of the 2021 NWSL season, the USSF announced that the federation player system would be abolished. In 2021, the last season in which the federation player system was in place in the NWSL, each American federation player counted as $33,000 and each Canadian federation player $27,500 against the NWSL team salary cap.

2013

Allocation process
For the initial allocation, each of the eight teams submitted which players they desired, ranking all players in each national team pool, and all the eligible players submitted which four teams they wanted to play for, as well as one team they didn't.  The results were then matched by a third party.

The initial player allocation was held on January 9, 2013, with each team's allocation announced on January 11. The USSF initially chose to fund 23 player salaries, while CSA and FMF both funded 16 players. Each team, except for the Western New York Flash, received three U.S., two Canadian, and two Mexican internationals; the Flash received two U.S. internationals.

Allocation results

Italic designates players who did not participate in the season* designates player who was traded during the season

Player withdrawals

Heather Mitts retired before the season started, Amy LePeilbet was out with injury all summer, and Amy Rodriguez took the season off due to pregnancy.

In the month leading up to opening day, the FMF withdrew funding for several of its players, removing them from the NWSL:
 Marylin Diaz and Luz Saucedo - failed fitness tests 
 Rubi Sandoval - reportedly injured
 Alina Garciamendez - had existing contract with FFC Frankfurt

Other post-allocation changes
On March 1, Chicago sent Winters and a fourth-round 2014 draft pick to Seattle in exchange for a first-round 2014 draft pick and a return of one of Seattle's allocated players to Chicago after the season was complete.  It was later revealed that Seattle would not send an allocated player to Chicago, with Winters losing her allocation status and Chicago getting a new allocated player.

On July 1, Kansas City traded Renae Cuellar and their third-round pick to Seattle in exchange for Teresa Noyola, right to Nikki Krzysik, and a second-round draft pick.  Cuellar had been a league-leading scorer until she had an injury and was unable to return to KC's starting lineup even after fully recovering.

On July 30, Chicago and Boston swapped Adriana Leon and Carmelina Moscato.

Kristie Mewis of FC Kansas City gained allocated status during the 2013 season.

Offseason changes
All three federations re-evaluated their allocations during the 2013-2014 offseason.  Teams made trades with their allocated players often before the allocations were announced, though.  There were four offseason trades before new allocations were officially announced, all involving the Seattle Reign.  On September 10, Carmelina Moscato was sent from Boston to Seattle in exchange for Kaylyn Kyle.  On October 25, Washington gave the rights to Alina Garciamendez (and to Nikki Marshall) to Seattle in exchange for Renae Cuellar (and rights to Jodie Taylor).  Third-round 2014 draft picks were also traded.  Third, Seattle sent Amy Rodriguez to FCKC in exchange for Kristie Mewis.   Finally, on November 18, Seattle gave away Mewis, Michelle Betos, and their first two 2015 draft picks to the Boston Breakers in exchange for Sydney Leroux.

2014
The new allocation list was revealed on January 3. Despite the addition of the expansion side Houston Dash, Canada did not increase their allocation to 18 players; Mexico decreased their allocation from 16 (effectively 12) to 8, similarly not accounting for the ninth team, and unlike Canada or the United States did not as a rule keep returning allocated players on their existing teams.  The United States increased their allocation from 23 to 26 players.  The Houston Dash were only allocated one US player but was allowed to take two more in the 2014 NWSL Expansion Draft.

Allocation results

Highlight designates difference from previous allocation† designates newly allocated player for 2014Italic designates a player that did not participate in the season* designates player who was traded during the season OR selected in the expansion draft

Post-allocation changes
The Houston Dash were very quick to get into the trading arena, sending Melissa Tancredi to Chicago in exchange for Erin McLeod on January 7.  They then selected Meghan Klingenberg, Lauren Sesselmann, and Arianna Romero in the expansion draft.

After the expansion draft, the trade limitation of allocated-for-same-country-allocated was lifted.  Players that were 'unevenly' traded once this restriction was lifted include Amy LePeilbet (to Kansas City), Karina LeBlanc (to Chicago), and Veronica Perez (to Washington).

When rosters were revealed on April 7, Crystal Dunn and Alyssa Naeher had received allocation status.

Offseason changes
Some allocated players were traded between teams before the new 2015 allocations were announced.  The Western New York Flash dealt Carli Lloyd to the Houston Dash in exchange for Whitney Engen (and Becky Edwards).  The Boston Breakers also traded Heather O'Reilly to FC Kansas City in exchange for unallocated rookies Morgan Marlborough and Kassey Kallman. Sophie Schmidt announced in January she would not play for Sky Blue FC nor the NWSL in order to focus on the 2015 FIFA Women's World Cup.

2015
Official allocation results for all three federations were announced on January 14, 2015, reducing the total number of allocated players to 42 (down from 50 in 2014 and 55 in 2013). Allocated players will play the first 3-4 NWSL games of the 2015 season before missing 7-8 games due to the 2015 FIFA Women's World Cup.

Allocation results

Highlight designates difference from previous allocation† designates newly allocated player for 2015Italic designates a player that did not participate in the season* designates player who was traded during the season

Post-allocation changes
Abby Wambach announced on March 18 she would not play for Western New York nor the NWSL in order to focus on the 2015 FIFA Women's World Cup. On March 30 Western New York traded Wambach, Amber Brooks, and their 2016 first round draft pick to Seattle for Sydney Leroux and Amanda Frisbie.

Offseason changes
After the Women's World Cup, many allocated players announced or discussed their plans to retire from national and club football.  Shannon Boxx did not finished the season NWSL season with her club; Lauren Holiday and Karina LeBlanc did.  Abby Wambach, who passed on the entire 2015 season, officially announced her retirement the day the USWNT visited the White House as part of their 2015 World Cup victory celebrations.

During the offseason, several trades took place to move allocated players, with Chicago and WNY swapping Whitney Engen and Adriana Leon for Chicago to further trade with Boston, swapping Engen for Alyssa Naeher.  WNY also sent Sydney Leroux to Kansas City after it was announced that Amy Rodriguez would miss the 2016 season to have her second child.

In addition, several allocated players swapped teams as part of the expansion of the Orlando Pride into the league. Portland sent Alex Morgan and Kaylyn Kyle to Orlando as part of a trade that included them receiving Meghan Klingenberg from Orlando after Orlando selected Klingenberg (and Orlando native Ashlyn Harris) in the 2015 NWSL Expansion Draft.

2016
Before the 2016 season, the Mexican Football Federation (FMF) announced that it would no longer allocate players to the NWSL, citing a lack of playing time. None of Mexico's allocated players had played during the 2015 NWSL season.

Primary allocation results for United States players were announced on January 13, 2016, with 24 allocated players.  Two days later, during the 2016 NWSL College Draft, NWSL also announced a new allocation process. Canada's allocation list was released with 11 players on February 8, 2016, all of whom were allocated under the old process.

Primary allocation results

Highlight designates difference from previous allocation† designates newly allocated player for 2016Italic designates a player that did not participate in the season* designates player who was traded during the season

(†) Emily Sonnett was also declared as an allocated player but would be subject to the 2016 NWSL College Draft, where she was selected by Portland Thorns FC with the first overall pick.

Unattached allocation order and results
Full details for the new process, officially termed Player Distribution, were revealed in late March a day before nine previously allocated players were to have their rights dispersed to other teams.  This new process, while first implemented for the 2016 Dispersal Draft, was rumored to have been finalized in time for Mallory Pugh to potential turn professional for the Portland Thorns.

In an effort to create a "equitable mechanism" of distributing players, federations can declare player(s) currently unattached to NWSL clubs to be allocation-eligible, at which point the NWSL have the opportunity to roster said player(s) on a rolling basis.  Players that have lost their allocation and are not picked up by their previous team are also eligible for distribution.  The distribution ranking order is determined by the previous season's finishing order (including playoffs) with expansion teams being granted the final spots in the order (i.e. after the defending champions). This order can only be changed by trades or when a team decides to accept a new player.

For the 2016 season, the new distribution process proceeded as follows:

Offseason changes
Alex Morgan to Lyon
Heather O'Reilly to Arsenal L.F.C.
Crystal Dunn to Chelsea L.F.C.
Ali Kreiger to Orlando
Diana Matheson to Seattle
Allysha Chapman to Boston

2017
NWSL switched from referring to "allocated players" to referring to "subsidized players" this season, as a result of the new subsidization process and evidenced when Canada announced its list of subsidized players on January 25, 2017. The list of 22 United States subsidized players was announced on April 6, 2017, the day after a new USWNT Collective Bargaining Agreement (CBA) was announced.

Previously-attached subsidized players

Highlight designates difference from previous list
† designates newly subsidized player whose rights were already held or acquired through the 2017 NWSL College Draft (i.e. avoiding the newly subsidized player distribution process)
‡ designates player new to NWSL added through unattached distribution order process
Italic designates a player that did not participate in the season
* designates player who was traded or changed status during the season

Unattached distribution order and results
For the 2017 season, the new distribution process proceeded as follows:

2018

Federation players
Federation players for the 2018 NWSL season were announced on February 15, 2018. There are 34 players from the United States and Canada total, including six new players, on the federation player list.

Highlight designates difference from previous list
† designates new federation player whose rights were already held or acquired (i.e. avoiding the newly subsidized player distribution process)
‡ designates player new to NWSL added through unattached distribution order process
Italic designates a player that did not participate in the season
* designates player who was traded or changed status during the season

In-season changes

Christen Press was traded from the Chicago Red Stars to the Houston Dash during the 2018 NWSL College Draft and was subsequently allocated to the Dash, but did not report to the team. She instead signed a short-term contract with Kopparbergs/Göteborg FC and played part of the 2018 Damallsvenskan season in Sweden.

On June 18, the Utah Royals acquired Press's rights from Houston in a three-team trade, and she joined the team later that month, before the scheduled end of her contract with Göteborg.

On May 9, the Houston Dash acquired Allysha Chapman from the North Carolina Courage.

On June 12, Adriana Leon was traded from Sky Blue FC (who had acquired her in the 2018 NWSL Dispersal Draft) to Seattle Reign FC.

On August 9, Janine Beckie signed a one-year deal with Manchester City of the FA Women's Super League.

Offseason changes 
Four American players — Jane Campbell, Amy Rodriguez, Taylor Smith, and Lynn Williams — were no longer federation players after the 2018 NWSL season.

Several Canadian players left the NWSL during the offseason. Sabrina D'Angelo signed for Swedish club Vittsjö GIK, Adriana Leon for English club West Ham United, and Rebecca Quinn for French club Paris FC.

After leaving the NWSL in 2017, Canadian goalkeeper Stephanie Labbé returned to the league prior to the 2019 season and was allocated to the North Carolina Courage. Canada had previously allocated Labbé to the Washington Spirit.

2019

Federation players 
A list of 22 United States federation players for the NWSL season was published first published on March 4, 2019. The NWSL officially confirmed the USWNT list, along with nine Canadian federation players, on April 5, 2019.

Highlight designates difference from previous list
† designates new federation player whose rights were already held or acquired (i.e. avoiding the newly subsidized player distribution process)
‡ designates player new to NWSL added through unattached distribution order process
Italic designates a player that did not participate in the season
* designates player who was traded or changed status during the season

2020

Federation players 
The list of 23 American and 9 Canadian federation players for the 2020 NWSL season was released on February 20, 2020; McCall Zerboni was the only player removed from the previous season. Tierna Davidson was added to the list for the first time and Ali Krieger was restored after last being on the list in 2017; Mallory Pugh and Emily Sonnett had been traded to new teams before the list was announced.

Highlight designates difference from previous list
† designates new federation player whose rights were already held or acquired (i.e. avoiding the newly subsidized player distribution process)
‡ designates player new to NWSL added through unattached distribution order process
Italic designates a player that did not participate in the season
* designates player who was traded or changed status during the season

In-season changes 
On March 3, 2020, Utah Royals FC traded defender Becky Sauerbrunn to Portland Thorns FC.

On August 10, 2020, midfielder Sam Mewis signed with Manchester City; North Carolina Courage retains her NWSL rights if she returns to the league.

On August 16, 2020, Washington Spirit traded midfielder Rose Lavelle to OL Reign. Lavelle signed with Manchester City two days later, but OL Reign retains her NWSL rights if she returns to the league.

On August 18, 2020, defender Emily Sonnett signed with Göteborg; Orlando Pride retains her NWSL rights if she returns to the league.

On August 20, 2020, Orlando Pride loaned defender Shelina Zadorsky to Tottenham Hotspur until December 31, 2020, with Tottenham having the option to make the move permanent.

On September 9, 2020, Tobin Heath and Christen Press signed with Manchester United; their former clubs, Portland Thorns FC and Utah Royals FC, retain their respective NWSL rights if they return to the league.

On September 12, 2020, Alex Morgan signed with Tottenham Hotspur; Orlando Pride retains her NWSL rights if she returns to the league.

Offseason changes 
On October 22, 2020, North Carolina Courage traded Crystal Dunn to Portland Thorns FC via OL Reign.

On November 12, 2020, Racing Louisville FC selected Tobin Heath and Christen Press in the 2020 NWSL Expansion Draft; Louisville will hold their NWSL rights if they return to the league.

On December 2, 2020, Utah Royals FC traded Kelley O'Hara to the Washington Spirit.

On December 21, 2020, Steph Labbé left North Carolina Courage to sign with Swedish club FC Rosengård.

On December 24, 2020, Washington Spirit acquired the rights to Emily Sonnett from Orlando Pride.

On December 29, 2020, Sky Blue FC traded Mallory Pugh to Chicago Red Stars.

On January 16, 2021, Abby Dahlkemper left North Carolina Courage to sign with English club Manchester City.

On February 24, 2021, Crystal Dunn and Lindsey Horan relinquished their federation player status and signed three-year contracts with Portland Thorns FC.

2021

Federation players 
The NWSL announced the list of 22 U.S. and 10 Canada federation players for the 2021 season on February 25, 2021.

Highlight designates difference from previous list
† designates new federation player whose rights were already held or acquired (i.e. avoiding the newly subsidized player distribution process)
‡ designates player new to NWSL added through unattached distribution order process
Italic designates a player that did not participate in the season
* designates player who was traded or changed status during the season

In-season changes 
On May 17, 2021, Rose Lavelle left Manchester City for OL Reign.

On May 17, 2021, Sam Mewis left Manchester City to re-join North Carolina Courage.

On July 7, 2021, Diana Matheson retired from professional soccer.

On August 17, 2021, Portland Thorns FC traded Adrianna Franch to Kansas City in exchange for Abby Smith and $150,000 in allocation money.

Offseason changes 
Carli Lloyd retired from professional soccer at the end of the 2021 NWSL season.

After the 2021 NWSL season, Emily Sonnett and Andi Sullivan relinquished their federation player status and signed two-year contracts with Washington Spirit.

On November 30, 2021, North Carolina Courage traded the rights to Sam Mewis to Kansas City Current in exchange for Kiki Pickett and the Current's natural first-round pick in the 2022 NWSL Draft.

On December 2, 2021, Chicago Red Stars traded the rights to Julie Ertz, Sarah Gorden, and an international spot for 2022 and 2023 to Angel City FC in exchange for roster protection in the 2022 NWSL Expansion Draft.

On December 4, 2021, NJ/NY Gotham FC traded the rights to Kailen Sheridan to San Diego Wave FC in exchange for $130,000 in allocation money and roster protection in the 2022 NWSL Expansion Draft.

On December 6, 2021, Orlando Pride traded the rights to Ashlyn Harris and Ali Krieger to NJ/NY Gotham FC in exchange for a first-round pick in the 2022 NWSL Draft, a natural third-round pick in the 2023 NWSL Draft, and $50,000 in allocation money.

On December 6, 2021, Tierna Davidson, Casey Krueger, Alyssa Naeher and Mallory Pugh relinquished their federation player status and signed multi-year contracts with Chicago Red Stars.

References

See also

 List of top-division football clubs in CONCACAF countries
 List of professional sports teams in the United States and Canada
 List of NWSL drafts
 2013 National Women's Soccer League season

Player allocation
National Women's Soccer League drafts